This is a list of diseases starting with the letter "C".

C
 C syndrome
 C1 esterase deficiency (angioedema)

Ca

Cac–Cal
 Cacchi–Ricci disease
 CACH syndrome
 Café au lait spots syndrome
 Caffeine-induced sleep disorder
 Caffey disease
 CAHMR syndrome
 Calcinosis cutis (see also CREST syndrome)
 Calciphylaxis
 Calculi
 Calderon–Gonzalez–Cantu syndrome
 Calloso genital dysplasia
 Callus disease
 Calpainopathy
 Calvarial hyperostosis

Cam–Can
 Camera–Marugo–Cohen syndrome
 Camfak syndrome
 Campomelia Cumming type
 Camptobrachydactyly
 Camptocormism
 Camptodactyly fibrous tissue hyperplasia skeletal dysplasia
 Camptodactyly joint contractures facial skeletal dysplasia
 Camptodactyly overgrowth unusual facies
 Camptodactyly syndrome Guadalajara type 1
 Camptodactyly syndrome Guadalajara type 2
 Camptodactyly taurinuria
 Camptodactyly vertebral fusion
 Campylobacteriosis
 Camurati–Engelmann disease
 Canavan leukodystrophy
 Candidiasis
 Candidiasis familial chronic
 Canga's bead symptom
 Canine distemper
 Cannabis dependence
 Cannabis withdrawal
 Cantalamessa–Baldini–Ambrosi syndrome
 Cantu–Sanchez–Corona–Fragoso syndrome
 Cantu–Sanchez–Corona–Garcia syndrome
 Cantu–Sanchez–Corona–Hernandes syndrome

Cap
 Capillary leak syndrome
 Capillary leak syndrome with monoclonal gammopathy
 Capillary venous leptomeningeal angiomatosis
 Caplan's syndrome
 Capos syndrome

Car

Cara–Carc
 Caratolo–Cilio–Pessagno syndrome
 Carbamoyl phosphate synthetase deficiency
 Carbamoyl-phosphate synthase I deficiency disease (ornithine carbamoyl phosphate deficiency)
 Carbohydrate deficient glycoprotein syndrome
 Carbon baby syndrome
 Carbonic anhydrase II deficiency
 Carcinoid syndrome
 Carcinoma of the vocal tract
 Carcinoma, squamous cell
 Carcinoma, squamous cell of head and neck
 Carcinophobia

Card

Cardi

Cardia
 Cardiac amyloidosis
 Cardiac and laterality defects
 Cardiac arrest
 Cardiac conduction defect, familial
 Cardiac diverticulum
 Cardiac hydatid cysts with intracavitary expansion
 Cardiac malformation
 Cardiac tamponade
 Cardiac valvular dysplasia, X-linked

Cardio
 Cardioauditory syndrome
 Cardioauditory syndrome of Sanchez-Cascos
 Cardiofacial syndrome short limbs
 Cardiofaciocutaneous syndrome
 Cardiogenital syndrome
 Cardiomelic syndrome Stratton Koehler type
 Cardiomyopathy:
 Arrhythmogenic right ventricular cardiomyopathy
 Cardiomyopathic lentiginosis
 Cardiomyopathy cataract hip spine disease
 Cardiomyopathy diabetes deafness
 Dilated cardiomyopathy: Cardiomyopathy dilated with conduction defect type 1, Cardiomyopathy dilated with conduction defect type 2, Cardiomyopathy, familial dilated
 Cardiomyopathy due to anthracyclines
 Cardiomyopathy hearing loss type t RNA lysine gene mutation
 Hypertrophic cardiomyopathy: familial
 Cardiomyopathy hypogonadism metabolic anomalies
 Cardiomyopathy spherocytosis
 Cardiomyopathy, fatal fetal, due to myocardial calcification
 Cardiomyopathy, X linked, fatal infantile
 Restrictive cardiomyopathy
 Cardioskeletal myopathy-neutropenia
 Cardiospasm

Care–Carr
 Caregiver syndrome
 Carey–Fineman–Ziter syndrome
 Carnevale–Canun–Mendoza syndrome
 Carnevale–Hernandez–Castillo syndrome
 Carnevale–Krajewska–Fischetto syndrome
 Carney syndrome
 Carnitine palmitoyl transferase deficiency
 Carnitine palmitoyltransferase I deficiency
 Carnitine palmitoyltransferase II deficiency
 Carnitine transporter deficiency
 Carnitine-acylcarnitine translocase deficiency
 Carnosinase deficiency
 Carnosinemia
 Caroli disease
 Carotenemia
 Carotid artery dissection
 Carpal deformity migrognathia microstomia
 Carpal tunnel syndrome
 Carpenter syndrome
 Carpenter–Hunter type
 Carpo tarsal osteolysis recessive
 Carpotarsal osteochondromatosis
 Carrington syndrome

Cart
 Cartilage hair hypoplasia like syndrome
 Cartilage–hair hypoplasia
 Cartilaginous neoplasms
 Cartwright–Nelson–Fryns syndrome

Cas
 Cassia–Stocco–Dos Santos syndrome
 Castleman's disease
 Castro–Gago–Pombo–Novo syndrome

Cat
 Cat cry syndrome – see Cri du chat
 Cat eye syndrome
 Cat Rodrigues syndrome
 Cat scratch disease

Cata
 Cataract
 Cataract, congenital ichthyosis
 Cataract aberrant oral frenula growth retardation
 Cataract anterior polar dominant
 Cataract ataxia deafness
 Cataract cardiomyopathy
 Cataract congenital autosomal dominant
 Cataract congenital dominant non nuclear
 Cataract congenital Volkmann type
 Cataract congenital with microphthalmia
 Cataract dental syndrome
 Cataract Hutterite type
 Cataract hypertrichosis mental retardation
 Cataract mental retardation hypogonadism
 Cataract microcornea syndrome
 Cataract microphthalmia septal defect
 Cataract skeletal anomalies
 Cataract, alopecia, sclerodactyly
 Cataract, congenital, with microcornea or slight microphthalmia
 Cataract, total congenital
 Cataract-glaucoma

Catc–Cate
 CATCH 22 syndrome
 Catecholamine hypertension
 Catel–Manzke syndrome

Cau–Cay
 Caudal appendage deafness
 Caudal duplication
 Caudal regression syndrome
 Causalgia
 Cavernous hemangioma
 Cavernous lymphangioma
 Cavernous sinus thrombosis
 Cayler syndrome

Cc–Cd
 CCA syndrome
 Ccge syndrome
 CCHS
 CDG syndrome
 CDG syndrome type 1A
 CDG syndrome type 1B
 CDG syndrome type 1C
 CDG syndrome type 2
 CDG syndrome type 3
 CDG syndrome type 4
 CDK4 linked melanoma

Ce

Cec–Cep
 Cecato De lima Pinheiro syndrome
 Celiac disease epilepsy occipital calcifications
 Celiac sprue
 Cenani–Lenz syndactylism
 Cennamo–Gangemi syndrome
 Central core disease
 Central diabetes insipidus
 Central nervous system protozoal infections
 Central serous chorioretinopathy
 Central type neurofibromatosis
 Centromeric instability immunodeficiency syndrome
 Centronuclear myopathy
 Centrotemporal epilepsy
 Cephalopolysyndactyly

Cer

Cera
 Ceramidase deficiency
 Ceramide trihexosidosis
 Ceraunophobia

Cere

Cereb

Cerebe
 Cerebellar agenesis
 Cerebellar ataxia areflexia pes cavus optic atrophy
 Cerebellar ataxia ectodermal dysplasia
 Cerebellar ataxia infantile with progressive external ophthalmoplegia
 Cerebellar ataxia, dominant pure
 Cerebellar degeneration
 Cerebellar degeneration, subacute
 Cerebellar hypoplasia
 Cerebellar hypoplasia endosteal sclerosis
 Cerebellar hypoplasia tapetoretinal degeneration
 Cerebellar parenchymal degeneration
 Cerebelloolivary atrophy
 Cerebelloparenchymal disorder 3
 Cerebellum agenesis hydrocephaly

Cerebr
 Cerebral amyloid angiopathy
 Cerebral amyloid angiopathy, familial
 Cerebral aneurysm
 Cerebral autosomal dominant arteriopathy with subcortical infarcts and leukoencephalopathy
 Cerebral calcification cerebellar hypoplasia
 Cerebral calcifications opalescent teeth phosphaturia
 Cerebral cavernous malformation
 Cerebral cavernous malformations
 Cerebral gigantism
 Cerebral gigantism jaw cysts
 Cerebral hypoxia
 Cerebral malformations hypertrichosis claw hands
 Cerebral palsy
 Cerebral thrombosis
 Cerebral ventricle neoplasms
 Cerebro facio articular syndrome
 Cerebro facio thoracic dysplasia
 Cerebro oculo dento auriculo skeletal syndrome
 Cerebro oculo genital syndrome
 Cerebro oculo skeleto renal syndrome
 Cerebro reno digital syndrome
 Cerebroarthrodigital syndrome
 Cerebro-costo-mandibular syndrome
 Cerebro-oculo-facio-skeletal syndrome
 Cerebroretinal vasculopathy

Cero–Cerv
 Ceroid lipofuscinois, neuronal
 Ceroid lipofuscinois, neuronal 1, infantile
 Ceroid lipofuscinois, neuronal 2, late infantile
 Ceroid lipofuscinois, neuronal 3, juvenile
 Ceroid lipofuscinois, neuronal 4, adult type
 Ceroid lipofuscinois, neuronal 5, late infantile
 Ceroid lipofuscinois, neuronal 6, late infantile
 Cervical cancer
 Cervical hypertrichosis neuropathy
 Cervical hypertrichosis peripheral neuropathy
 Cervical ribs sprengel anomaly polydactyly
 Cervical spinal stenosis
 Cervical vertebral fusion
 Cervicooculoacoustic syndrome

Ch

Cha

Chag–Chao
 Chagas disease
 Chalazion
 Chanarin disease
 Chanarin–Dorfman syndrome ichthyosis
 Chancroid
 Chandler's syndrome
 Chands syndrome
 Chang–Davidson–Carlson syndrome
 Chaotic atrial tachycardia

Char
 Char syndrome

Charcot
Charcot d
 Charcot disease
Charcot–Marie–Tooth disease
 Charcot–Marie–Tooth disease
 Charcot–Marie–Tooth disease deafness dominant type
 Charcot–Marie–Tooth disease deafness mental retardation
 Charcot–Marie–Tooth disease deafness recessive type
 Charcot–Marie–Tooth disease type 1 aplasia cutis congenita
 Charcot–Marie–Tooth disease type 1A
 Charcot–Marie–Tooth disease type 1B
 Charcot–Marie–Tooth disease type 1C
 Charcot–Marie–Tooth disease type 2A
 Charcot–Marie–Tooth disease type 2B1
 Charcot–Marie–Tooth disease type 2B2
 Charcot–Marie–Tooth disease type 2C
 Charcot–Marie–Tooth disease type 2D
 Charcot–Marie–Tooth disease type 4A
 Charcot–Marie–Tooth disease type 4B
 Charcot–Marie–Tooth disease with ptosis and parkinsonism
 Charcot–Marie–Tooth disease, intermediate form
 Charcot–Marie–Tooth disease, neuronal, type A
 Charcot–Marie–Tooth disease, neuronal, type B
 Charcot–Marie–Tooth disease, neuronal, type D
 Charcot–Marie–Tooth disease, X-linked type 2, recessive
 Charcot–Marie–Tooth disease, X-linked type 3, recessive
 Charcot–Marie–Tooth peroneal muscular atrophy, X-linked

Charg–Charl
 CHARGE syndrome
 Charles' disease
 Charlie M syndrome

Chav
 Chavany–Brunhes syndrome

Che
 Chediak–Higashi syndrome
 Cheilitis glandularis
 Chemke–Oliver–Mallek syndrome
 Chemodectoma
 Chemophobia
 Chen-Kung Ho–Kaufman–Mcalister syndrome
 Cherubism

Chi–Chl
 Chiari type 1 malformation
 Chiari–Frommel syndrome
 Chickenpox
 Chikungunya
 CHILD syndrome ichthyosis
 Childhood disintegrative disorder
 Childhood pustular psoriasis
 Chimerism
 Chinese restaurant syndrome
 Chitayat–Haj–Chahine syndrome
 Chitayat–Meunier–Hodgkinson syndrome
 Chitayat–Moore–Del Bigio syndrome
 Chitty–Hall–Baraitser syndrome
 Chitty–Hall–Webb syndrome
 Chlamydia
 Chlamydia pneumoniae
 Chlamydia trachomatis
 Chlamydial and gonococcal conjunctivitis

Cho

Choa–Chol
 Choanal atresia deafness cardiac defects dysmorphia
 Cholangiocarcinoma
 Cholangitis, primary sclerosing
 Cholecystitis
 Choledochal cyst, hand malformation
 Cholelithiasis
 Cholemia, familial
 Cholera
 Cholestasis
 Cholestasis pigmentary retinopathy cleft palate
 Cholestasis, progressive familial intrahepatic
 Cholestasis, progressive familial intrahepatic 1
 Cholestasis, progressive familial intrahepatic 2
 Cholestasis, progressive familial intrahepatic 3
 Cholestatic jaundice renal tubular insufficiency
 Cholesterol ester storage disease
 Cholesterol esterification disorder
 Cholesterol pneumonia

Chon
 Chondroblastoma
 Chondrocalcinosis
 Chondrocalcinosis familial articular
 Chondrodysplasia lethal recessive
 Chondrodysplasia pseudohermaphrodism syndrome
 Chondrodysplasia punctata
 Chondrodysplasia punctata 1, x-linked recessive
 Chondrodysplasia punctata with steroid sulfatase deficiency
 Chondrodysplasia punctata, brachytelephalangic
 Chondrodysplasia punctata, Sheffield type
 Chondrodysplasia situs inversus imperforate anus polydactyly
 Chondrodysplasia, Grebe type
 Chondrodystrophy
 Chondroectodermal dysplasia
 Chondroma (benign)
 Chondromalacia
 Chondromatosis (benign)
 Chondrosarcoma (malignant)
 Chondrysplasia punctata, humero-metacarpal type

Chor
 Chordoma
 Chorea
 Chorea acanthocytosis
 Chorea familial benign
 Chorea minor
 Choreoacanthocytosis amyotrophic
 Choreoathetosis familial paroxysmal
 Choriocarcinoma
 Chorioretinitis
 Chorioretinopathy dominant form microcephaly
 Choroid plexus cyst
 Choroid plexus neoplasms
 Choroidal atrophy alopecia
 Choroideremia
 Choroideremia hypopituitarism
 Choroiditis
 Choroiditis, serpiginous
 Choroido cerebral calcification syndrome infantile

Chr

Chri
 Christian–Demyer–Franken syndrome
 Christian–Johnson–Angenieta syndrome
 Christian syndrome
 Christianson–Fourie syndrome
 Christmas disease

Chro

Chrom
 Chromhidrosis

Chromo
Chromom–Chromop
 Chromomycosis
 Chromophobe renal carcinoma
Chromos
Chromosoma
 Chromosomal triplication
Chromosome
Chromosome 1
 Chromosome 1 ring
 Chromosome 1, 1p36 deletion syndrome
 Chromosome 1, deletion q21 q25
 Chromosome 1, duplication 1p21 p32
 Chromosome 1, monosomy 1p
 Chromosome 1, monosomy 1p22 p13
 Chromosome 1, monosomy 1p31 p22
 Chromosome 1, monosomy 1p32
 Chromosome 1, monosomy 1p34 p32
 Chromosome 1, monosomy 1q25 q32
 Chromosome 1, monosomy 1q32 q42
 Chromosome 1, monosomy 1q4
 Chromosome 1, q42 11 q42 12 duplication
 Chromosome 1, trisomy 1q32 qter
 Chromosome 1, trisomy 1q42 qter
 Chromosome 1, uniparental disomy 1q12 q21
Chromosome 10 – Chromosome 12
 Chromosome 10 ring
 Chromosome 10, distal trisomy 10q
 Chromosome 10, monosomy 10p
 Chromosome 10, monosomy 10q
 Chromosome 10, trisomy 10p
 Chromosome 10, trisomy 10pter p13
 Chromosome 10, trisomy 10q
 Chromosome 10, uniparental disomy of
 Chromosome 10p terminal deletion syndrome
 Chromosome 11, deletion 11p
 Chromosome 11, partial trisomy 11q
 Chromosome 11-14 translocation
 Chromosome 11p, partial deletion
 Chromosome 11q partial deletion
 Chromosome 11q trisomy
 Chromosome 12 ring
 Chromosome 12, 12p trisomy
 Chromosome 12, trisomy 12q
 Chromosome 12p deletion
 Chromosome 12p partial deletion
Chromosome 13 – Chromosome 15
 Chromosome 13 duplication
 Chromosome 13 ring
 Chromosome 13, partial monosomy 13q
 Chromosome 13p duplication
 Chromosome 13q deletion
 Chromosome 13q trisomy
 Chromosome 13q-mosaicism
 Chromosome 14 ring
 Chromosome 14 trisomy
 Chromosome 14, deletion 14q, partial duplication 14p
 Chromosome 14, trisomy mosaic
 Chromosome 14q, partial deletions
 Chromosome 14q, proximal duplication
 Chromosome 14q, terminal deletion
 Chromosome 14q, terminal duplication
 Chromosome 15 ring
 Chromosome 15, distal trisomy 15q
 Chromosome 15, trisomy mosaicism
 Chromosome 15q, partial deletion
 Chromosome 15q, tetrasomy
 Chromosome 15q, trisomy
Chromosome 16 – Chromosome 1q
 Chromosome 16, trisomy 16p
 Chromosome 16, trisomy 16q
 Chromosome 16, trisomy
 Chromosome 16, uniparental disomy
 Chromosome 17 trisomy
 Chromosome 17 deletion
 Chromosome 17 ring
 Chromosome 17, deletion 17q23 q24
 Chromosome 17, trisomy 17p
 Chromosome 17, trisomy 17p11 2
 Chromosome 17, trisomy 17q22
 Chromosome 18 long arm deletion syndrome
 Chromosome 18 mosaic monosomy
 Chromosome 18 ring
 Chromosome 18, deletion 18q23
 Chromosome 18, monosomy 18p
 Chromosome 18, tetrasomy 18p
 Chromosome 18, trisomy 18p
 Chromosome 18, trisomy 18q
 Chromosome 18, trisomy
 Chromosome 19 ring
 Chromosome 19, trisomy 19q
 Chromosome 1q, duplication 1q12 q21
Chromosome 2
 Chromosome 2, monosomy 2p22
 Chromosome 2, monosomy 2pter p24
 Chromosome 2, monosomy 2q
 Chromosome 2, monosomy 2q24
 Chromosome 2, monosomy 2q37
 Chromosome 2, trisomy 2p
 Chromosome 2, Trisomy 2p13 p21
 Chromosome 2, trisomy 2pter p24
 Chromosome 2, trisomy 2q
 Chromosome 2, trisomy 2q37
Chromosome 20 – Chromosome 22
 Chromosome 20 ring
 Chromosome 20, deletion 20p
 Chromosome 20, duplication 20p
 Chromosome 20, trisomy
 Chromosome 21 monosomy
 Chromosome 21 ring
 Chromosome 21, monosomy 21q22
 Chromosome 21, tetrasomy 21q
 Chromosome 21, uniparental disomy of
 Chromosome 22 ring
 Chromosome 22 trisomy mosaic
 Chromosome 22, microdeletion 22 q11
 Chromosome 22, monosome mosaic
 Chromosome 22, trisomy q11 q13
 Chromosome 22, trisomy
Chromosome 3
 Chromosome 3 duplication syndrome
 Chromosome 3, monosomy 3p
 Chromosome 3, monosomy 3p14 p11
 Chromosome 3, monosomy 3p2
 Chromosome 3, monosomy 3p25
 Chromosome 3, monosomy 3q13
 Chromosome 3, monosomy 3q21 23
 Chromosome 3, monosomy 3q27
 Chromosome 3, trisomy 3p
 Chromosome 3, trisomy 3p25
 Chromosome 3, trisomy 3q
 Chromosome 3, trisomy 3q13 2 q25
 Chromosome 3, Trisomy 3q2
Chromosome 4 – Chromosome 5
 Chromosome 4 ring
 Chromosome 4 short arm deletion
 Chromosome 4, monosomy 4p14 p16
 Chromosome 4, monosomy 4q
 Chromosome 4, monosomy 4q32
 Chromosome 4, monosomy distal 4q
 Chromosome 4, partial trisomy distal 4q
 Chromosome 4, Trisomy 4p
 Chromosome 4, trisomy 4q
 Chromosome 4, trisomy 4q21
 Chromosome 4, trisomy 4q25 qter
 Chromosome 5, monosomy 5q35
 Chromosome 5, trisomy 5p
 Chromosome 5, trisomy 5pter p13 3
 Chromosome 5, trisomy 5q
 Chromosome 5, uniparental disomy
Chromosome 6 – Chromosome 7
 Chromosome 6 ring
 Chromosome 6, deletion 6q13 q15
 Chromosome 6, monosomy 6p23
 Chromosome 6, monosomy 6q
 Chromosome 6, monosomy 6q1
 Chromosome 6, monosomy 6q2
 Chromosome 6, partial trisomy 6q
 Chromosome 6, trisomy 6p
 Chromosome 6, trisomy 6q
 Chromosome 7 ring
 Chromosome 7, monosomy 7q2
 Chromosome 7, monosomy 7q21
 Chromosome 7, monosomy 7q3
 Chromosome 7, monosomy
 Chromosome 7, partial monosomy 7p
 Chromosome 7, trisomy 7p
 Chromosome 7, trisomy 7p13 p12 2
 Chromosome 7, trisomy 7q
 Chromosome 7, trisomy mosaic
Chromosome 8 – Chromosome 9
 Chromosome 8 deletion
 Chromosome 8 ring
 Chromosome 8, monosomy 8p
 Chromosome 8, monosomy 8p2
 Chromosome 8, monosomy 8p23 1
 Chromosome 8, monosomy 8q
 Chromosome 8, mosaic trisomy
 Chromosome 8, partial trisomy
 Chromosome 8, trisomy 8p
 Chromosome 8, trisomy 8q
 Chromosome 8, trisomy
 Chromosome 9 inversion or duplication
 Chromosome 9 Ring
 Chromosome 9, duplication 9q21
 Chromosome 9, monosomy 9p
 Chromosome 9, partial monosomy 9p
 Chromosome 9, partial trisomy 9p
 Chromosome 9, tetrasomy 9p
 Chromosome 9, trisomy 9q
 Chromosome 9, trisomy 9q32
 Chromosome 9, trisomy mosaic
 Chromosome 9, trisomy
Chromosomes
 Chromosomes 1 and 2, monosomy 2q duplication 1p

Chron
 Chronic berylliosis
 Chronic bronchitis
 Chronic demyelinizing neuropathy with IgM monoclonal
 Chronic erosive gastritis
 Chronic fatigue immune dysfunction syndrome
 Chronic fatigue syndrome
 Chronic granulomatous disease
 Chronic hiccup
 Chronic inflammatory demyelinating polyneuropathy
 Chronic lymphocytic leukemia
 Chronic mountain sickness
 Chronic myelogenous leukemia
 Chronic myelomonocytic leukemia
 Chronic necrotizing vasculitis
 Chronic neutropenia
 Chronic obstructive pulmonary disease
 Chronic polyradiculoneuritis
 Chronic recurrent multifocal osteomyelitis
 Chronic renal failure
 Chronic spasmodic dysphonia
 Chronic, infantile, neurological, cutaneous, articular syndrome

Chu–Chy
 Chudley–Lowry–Hoar syndrome
 Chudley–Rozdilsky syndrome
 Chudley–Mccullough syndrome
 Churg–Strauss syndrome
 Chylous ascites

Ci
 Cicatricial pemphigoid
 Ciguatera fish poisoning
 Ciliary discoordination, due to random ciliary orientation
 Ciliary dyskinesia, due to transposition of ciliary microtubules
 Ciliary dyskinesia-bronchiectasis
 Cilliers–Beighton syndrome
 Cinchonism
 Circumscribed cutaneous aplasia of the vertex
 Circumscribed disseminated keratosis Jadassohn–Lew type
 Citrullinemia

Cl

Cla
 Clarkson disease
 Clayton–Smith–Donnai syndrome

Cle

Clef

Cleft

Cleft h – Cleft l
 Cleft hand absent tibia
 Cleft lip
 Cleft lip and palate malrotation cardiopathy
 Cleft lip and/or palate with mucous cysts of lower
 Cleft lip palate abnormal thumbs microcephaly
 Cleft lip palate deafness sacral lipoma
 Cleft lip palate dysmorphism Kumar type
 Cleft lip palate ectrodactyly
 Cleft lip palate incisor and finger anomalies
 Cleft lip palate mental retardation corneal opacity
 Cleft lip palate oligodontia syndactyly pili torti
 Cleft lip palate pituitary deficiency
 Cleft lip palate-tetraphocomelia
 Cleft lip with or without cleft palate
 Cleft lower lip cleft lateral canthi chorioretinal

Cleft p – Cleft u
 Cleft palate
 Cleft palate cardiac defect ectrodactyly
 Cleft palate colobomata radial synostosis deafness
 Cleft palate heart disease polydactyly absent tibia
 Cleft palate lateral synechia syndrome
 Cleft palate short stature vertebral anomalies
 Cleft palate stapes fixation oligodontia
 Cleft palate X linked
 Cleft tongue syndrome
 Cleft upper lip median cutaneous polyps

Clefti
 Clefting ectropion conical teeth

Clei
 Cleidocranial dysplasia
 Cleidocranial dysplasia micrognathia absent thumbs

Cli–Clu
 Cloacal exstrophy
 Clonal hypereosinophilia
 Clouston syndrome
 Cloverleaf skull bone dysplasia
 Cloverleaf skull micromelia thoracic dysplasia
 Clubfoot
 Cluster headache

Cm
 CMV antenatal infection

Co

Coa–Cof
 Coach syndrome
 Coal workers' pneumoconiosis
 Coarctation of aorta dominant
 Coarse face hypotonia constipation
 Coats disease
 Cocaine antenatal infection
 Cocaine dependence
 Cocaine fetopathy
 Cocaine intoxication
 Coccidioidomycosis
 Cochin Jewish Disorder
 Cockayne syndrome type 1
 Cockayne syndrome type 2
 Cockayne syndrome type 3
 Cockayne's syndrome
 Codas syndrome
 Codesette syndrome
 Coeliac disease

 Coenzyme Q cytochrome c reductase deficiency of
 Coffin–Lowry syndrome
 Coffin–Siris syndrome
 COFS syndrome

Cog–Coh
 Cogan–Reese syndrome
 Cogan syndrome
 Cohen-Gibson syndrome
 Cohen–Hayden syndrome
 Cohen–Lockood–Wyborney syndrome
 Cohen syndrome

Col

Cola–Coll
 Colavita–Kozlowski syndrome
Cold abscess
 Cold agglutination syndrome
 Cold agglutinin disease
 Cold antibody hemolytic anemia
 Cold contact urticaria
 Cold urticaria
 Cole carpenter syndrome
 Coleman–Randall syndrome
 Colitis
 Collagen disorder
 Collagenous colitis
 Collins–Pope syndrome
 Collins–Sakati syndrome

Colo–Colv
 Coloboma chorioretinal cerebellar vermis aplasia
 Coloboma hair abnormality
 Coloboma of choroid and retina
 Coloboma of eye lens
 Coloboma of iris
 Coloboma of lens ala nasi
 Coloboma of macula type B brachydactyly
 Coloboma of macula
 Coloboma of optic nerve
 Coloboma of optic papilla
 Coloboma porencephaly hydronephrosis
 Coloboma uveal with cleft lip palate and mental retardation
 Coloboma, ocular
 Colobomata unilobar lung heart defect
 Colobomatous microphthalmia heart disease hearing
 Colobomatous microphthalmia
 Colon cancer, familial nonpolyposis
 Colonic atresia
 Colonic malakoplakia
 Color blindness
 Colorado tick fever
 Colver–Steer–Godman syndrome

Com
 Combarros–Calleja–Leno syndrome
 Combined hyperlipidemia, familial
 Common cold
 Common mesentery
 Common variable immunodeficiency
 Compartment syndrome
 Complement component 2 deficiency
 Complement component receptor 1
 Complete atrioventricular canal
 Complex 1 mitochondrial respiratory chain deficiency
 Complex 2 mitochondrial respiratory chain deficiency
 Complex 3 mitochondrial respiratory chain deficiency
 Complex 4 mitochondrial respiratory chain deficiency
 Complex 5 mitochondrial respiratory chain deficiency
 Complex regional pain syndrome

Con

Cond–Cone
 Conduct disorder
 Conductive deafness malformed external ear
 Conductive hearing loss
 Condyloma acuminatum
 Condylomata lata
 Cone dystrophy
 Cone rod dystrophy amelogenesis imperfecta
 Cone-rod dystrophy

Cong

Conge

Congen
Congenital a – Congenital b
 Congenital absence of the uterus and vagina
 Congenital adrenal hyperplasia
 Congenital adrenal hyperplasia due to 11β-hydroxylase deficiency
 Congenital adrenal hyperplasia due to 17 alpha-hydroxylase deficiency
 Congenital adrenal hyperplasia due to 21-hydroxylase deficiency
 Congenital adrenal hyperplasia due to 3 beta-hydroxysteroid dehydrogenase deficiency
 Congenital adrenal hyperplasia, lipoid
 Congenital afibrinogenemia
 Congenital alopecia X linked
 Congenital amputation
 Congenital aneurysms of the great vessels
 Congenital antithrombin III deficiency
 Congenital aplastic anemia
 Congenital arteriovenous shunt
 Congenital articular rigidity
 Congenital benign spinal muscular atrophy dominant
 Congenital brain disorder
 Congenital bronchobiliary fistula
Congenital c – Congenital g
 Congenital cardiovascular disorder
 Congenital cardiovascular malformations
 Congenital cardiovascular shunt
 Congenital central hypoventilation syndrome
 Congenital constricting band
 Congenital contractural arachnodactyly
 Congenital contractures
 Congenital craniosynostosis maternal hyperthyroiditis
 Congenital cystic adenomatoid malformation
 Congenital cystic eye multiple ocular and intracranial anomalies
 Congenital cytomegalovirus
 Congenital deafness
 Congenital diaphragmatic hernia
 Congenital disorder of glycosylation
 Congenital dyserythropoietic anemia
 Congenital erythropoietic porphyria
 Congenital facial diplegia
 Congenital fiber type disproportion
 Congenital gastrointestinal disorder
 Congenital generalized fibromatosis
 Congenital giant megaureter
Congenital h – Congenital l
 Congenital heart block
 Congenital heart disease ptosis hypodontia craniostosis
 Congenital heart disease radio ulnar synostosis mental retardation
 Congenital heart disorder
 Congenital heart septum defect
 Congenital hemidysplasia with ichthyosiform erythroderma and limbs defects
 Congenital hemolytic anemia
 Congenital hepatic fibrosis
 Congenital hepatic porphyria
 Congenital herpes simplex
 Congenital hypomyelination neuropathy
 Congenital hypothyroidism
 Congenital hypotrichosis milia
 Congenital ichthyosis, microcephalus, q­riplegia
 Congenital ichthyosis
 Congenital ichtyosiform erythroderma
 Congenital insensitivity to pain with anhidrosis
 Congenital kidney disorder
 Congenital limb deficiency
 Congenital lobar emphysema
Congenital m – Congenital s
 Congenital megacolon
 Congenital megaloureter
 Congenital mesoblastic nephroma
 Congenital microvillous atrophy
 Congenital mitral malformation
 Congenital mitral stenosis
 Congenital mixovirus
 Congenital mumps
 Congenital muscular dystrophy syringomyelia
 Congenital myopathy
 Congenital nephrotic syndrome
 Congenital nonhemolytic jaundice
 Congenital rubella
 Congenital short bowel
 Congenital short femur
 Congenital skeletal disorder
 Congenital skin disorder
 Congenital spherocytic anemia
 Congenital spherocytic hemolytic anemia
 Congenital stenosis of cervical medullary canal
 Congenital sucrose isomaltose malabsorption
 Congenital syphilis
Congenital t – Congenital v
 Congenital toxoplasmosis
 Congenital unilateral pulmonary hypoplasia
 Congenital vagal hyperreflexivity
 Congenital varicella syndrome

Conges
 Congestive heart failure

Conju
 Conjunctivitis ligneous
 Conjunctivitis with pseudomembrane
 Conjunctivitis

Conn–Conv
 Connective tissue dysplasia Spellacy type
 Connexin 26 anomaly
 Conn's syndrome
 Conotruncal heart malformations
 Conradi–Hünermann syndrome
 Constitutional growth delay
 Constrictive bronchiolitis
 Contact dermatitis
 Contact dermatitis, allergic
 Contact dermatitis, irritant
 Contact dermatitis, photocontact
 Continuous muscle fiber activity hereditary
 Continuous spike-wave during slow sleep syndrome
 Contractural arachnodactyly
 Contractures ectodermal dysplasia cleft lip palate
 Contractures hyperkeratosis lethal
 Contractures of feet-muscle atrophy-oculomotor apraxia
 Conversion disorder
 Convulsions benign familial neonatal dominant form
 Convulsions benign familial neonatal

Coo–Cop
 Cooks syndrome
 Cooley's anemia
 Copper deficiency familial benign
 Copper transport disease
 Coproporhyria

Cor
 Cor biloculare
 Cor pulmonale
 Cor triatriatum

Corm–Coro
 Cormier–Rustin–Munnich syndrome
 Corneal anesthesia deafness mental retardation
 Corneal cerebellar syndrome
 Corneal crystals myopathy neuropathy
 Corneal dystrophy
 Corneal endothelium dystrophy
 Cornelia de Lange syndrome
 Corneodermatoosseous syndrome
 Coronal synostosis syndactyly jejunal atresia
 Coronaro-cardiac fistula
 Coronary arteries congenital malformation
 Coronary artery aneurysm
 Coronary heart disease
 Coronavirus disease 2019

Corp–Cort
 Corpus callosum agenesis
 Corpus callosum dysgenesis
 Corsello–Opitz syndrome
 Cortada–Koussef–Matsumoto syndrome
 Cortes-Lacassie syndrome
 Cortical blindness mental retardation polydactyly
 Cortical degeneration of the cerebellum parenchymatous
 Cortical dysplasia
 Cortical hyperostosis syndactyly
 Corticobasal degeneration

Cos–Cox
 Costello syndrome
 Costochondritis (otherwise Costal chondritis)
 Costocoracoid ligament congenitally short
 Cote–Adamopoulos–Pantelakis syndrome
 Cote–Katsantoni syndrome
 Cousin–Walbraum–Cegarra syndrome
 Covesdem syndrome
 Cowchock–Wapner–Kurtz syndrome
 Cowden's disease
 Cowpox
 Coxoauricular syndrome

Cr

Cra

Cram
 Cramer–Niederdellmann syndrome
 Cramp
 Cramp fasciculation syndrome

Cran

Crand–Crane
 Crandall syndrome
 Crane–Heise syndrome

Crani

Cranio
 Cranio osteoarthropathy
Cranioa–Craniom
 Cranioacrofacial syndrome
 Craniodiaphyseal dysplasia
 Craniodigital syndrome mental retardation
 Cranioectodermal dysplasia
 Craniofacial and osseous defects mental retardation
 Craniofacial and skeletal defects
 Craniofacial deafness hand syndrome
 Craniofacial dysostosis arthrogryposis progeroid appearance
 Craniofacial dysostosis
 Craniofacial dysynostosis
 Craniofaciocardioskeletal syndrome
 Craniofaciocervical osteoglyphic dysplasia
 Craniofrontonasal dysplasia
 Craniofrontonasal syndrome Teebi type
 Craniometaphyseal dysplasia dominant type
 Craniometaphyseal dysplasia recessive type
 Craniomicromelic syndrome
Cranios–Craniot
 Craniostenosis cataract
 Craniostenosis with congenital heart disease mental retardation
 Craniostenosis
 Craniosynostosis alopecia brain defect
 Craniosynostosis arthrogryposis cleft palate
 Craniosynostosis autosomal dominant
 Craniosynostosis cleft lip palate arthrogryposis
 Craniosynostosis contractures cleft
 Craniosynostosis exostoses nevus epibulbar dermoid
 Craniosynostosis fibular aplasia
 Craniosynostosis Fontaine type
 Craniosynostosis Maroteaux Fonfria type
 Craniosynostosis mental retardation clefting syndrome
 Craniosynostosis mental retardation heart defects
 Craniosynostosis Philadelphia type
 Craniosynostosis radial aplasia syndrome
 Craniosynostosis synostoses hypertensive nephropathy
 Craniosynostosis Warman type
 Craniosynostosis, sagittal, with Dandy-Walker malformation and hydrocephalus
 Craniosynostosis
 Craniotelencephalic dysplasia

Craw
 Crawfurd syndrome

Cre–Cro
 Creatine deficiency
 Creeping disease
 CREST syndrome (Calcinosis Raynaud's Esophagus Sclerodactyly Telangiectasia)
 Cretinism athyreotic
 Cretinism
 Creutzfeldt–Jakob disease
 Cri du chat
 Crigler–Najjar syndrome
 Crisponi syndrome
 Criss cross syndrome
 Criswick–Schepens syndrome
 Crohn's disease of the esophagus
 Crohn's disease
 Crome syndrome
 Cronkhite–Canada syndrome
 Crossed polydactyly type 1
 Crossed polysyndactyly
 Croup
 Crouzon syndrome
 Crouzonodermoskeletal syndrome
 Crow–Fukase syndrome

Cry
 Cryoglobulinemia
 Cryophobia
 Cryptococcosis
 Cryptogenic organized pneumopathy
 Cryptomicrotia brachydactyly syndrome excess fingers
 Cryptomicrotia brachydactyly syndrome
 Cryptophthalmos-syndactyly syndrome
 Cryptosporidiosis
 Cryptorchidism arachnodactyly mental retardation
 Cryroglobulinemia
 Crystal deposit disease

Cu

Cul–Cus
 Culler–Jones syndrome
 Curly hair ankyloblepharon nail dysplasia syndrome
 Currarino triad
 Curry–Hall syndrome
 Curth–Macklin type ichthyosis hystrix
 Curtis–Rogers–Stevenson syndrome
 Cushing syndrome, familial
 Cushing's symphalangism
 Cushing's syndrome

Cut
 Cutaneous anthrax
 Cutaneous larva migrans
 Cutaneous lupus erythematosus
 Cutaneous photosensitivity colitis lethal
 Cutaneous T-cell lymphoma
 Cutaneous vascularitis
 Cutis Gyrata syndrome of Beare and Stevenson
 Cutis gyratum acanthosis nigricans craniosynostosis
 Cutis laxa
 Cutis laxa, recessive
 Cutis laxa corneal clouding mental retardation
 Cutis laxa osteoporosis
 Cutis laxa with joint laxity and retarded development
 Cutis laxa, dominant type
 Cutis laxa, recessive type 1
 Cutis laxa, recessive type 2
 Cutis marmorata telangiectatica congenita
 Cutis verticis gyrata mental deficiency
 Cutis verticis gyrata thyroid aplasia mental retardation
 Cutis verticis gyrata
 Cutler Bass Romshe syndrome

Cy–Cz
 Cyanide poisoning
 Cyclic neutropenia
 Cyclic vomiting syndrome
 Cyclosporosis
 Cyclothymia
 Cypress facial neuromusculoskeletal syndrome
 Cystathionine beta synthetase deficiency
 Cystic adenomatoid malformation of lung
 Cystic angiomatosis of bone, diffuse
 Cystic fibrosis gastritis megaloblastic anemia
 Cystic fibrosis
 Cystic hamartoma of lung and kidney
 Cystic hygroma lethal cleft palate
 Cystic hygroma
 Cystic medial necrosis of aorta
 Cystin transport, protein defect of
 Cystinosis
 Cystinuria
 Cystinuria-lysinuria
 Cytochrome C oxidase deficiency
 Cytomegalic inclusion disease
 Cytomegalovirus
 Cytoplasmic body myopathy
 Czeizel–Losonci syndrome
 Czeizel syndrome

C